The 2005 European Amateur Team Championship took place 1–5 July at Royal The Hague Golf & Country Club in Wassenaar, Netherlands. It was the 23rd men's golf European Amateur Team Championship.

Venue 
The course at Royal The Hague Golf & Country Club, situated in an undulating dune landscape in Wassenaar, 10 kilometres north of the city center of  The Hague, was designed in 1938, by Harry Colt and C.H. Alison.

The championship course was set up with par 72.

Format 
Each team consisted of 6 players, playing two rounds of stroke-play over two days, counting the five best scores each day for each team.

The eight best teams formed flight A, in knock-out match-play over the next three days. The teams were seeded based on their positions after the stroke play. The first placed team were drawn to play the quarter final against the eight placed team, the second against the seventh, the third against the sixth and the fourth against the fifth. Teams were allowed to use six players during the team matches, selecting four of them in the two morning foursome games and five players in to the afternoon single games. Games all square at the 18th hole were declared halved, if the team match was already decided.

The eight teams placed 9–16 in the qualification stroke-play formed flight B, to play similar knock-out play, with one foursome game and four single games in each match, to decide their final positions.

The four teams placed 17–20 formed flight C, to play each other in a round-robin system, with one foursome game and four single games in each match, to decide their final positions.

Teams 
20 nation teams contested the event, three teams lesser than at the previous event two years earlier. Each team consisted of six players.

Players in the leading teams

Other participating teams

Winners 
Four-time-winners team Ireland won the opening 36-hole competition, with a 4-under-par score of 716, 11 strokes ahead of team Norway on 2nd place and host nation Netherlands another two strokes behind. Defending champions team Scotland did not make it to the quarter finals, finishing tenth. 1999 champions Italy missed the quarter finals on a tiebreaker, with the same qualifying score as England and Sweden on tied 7th place.

There was no official award for the lowest individual score, but individual leaders were Justin Kehoe, Ireland, and Torstein Nevestad, Norway, each with a 5-under-par score of 139, one stroke ahead of Alex Smith, Wales.

Team Spain won the gold medal, earning their second title in four years, beating team England in the final 5–2.

Team Sweden earned the bronze on third place, after beating France 4–3 in the bronze match.

Results 
Qualification round

Team standings

* Note: In the event of a tie the order was determined by the best total of the two non-counting scores of the two rounds.

Individual leaders

 Note: There was no official award for the lowest individual score.

Flight A

Bracket

Final games

Flight B

Bracket

Flight C

First round

Second round

Third round

Final standings

Sources:

See also 
 European Golf Association – Organizer of European amateur golf championships
 Eisenhower Trophy – biennial world amateur team golf championship for men organized by the International Golf Federation.
 European Ladies' Team Championship – European amateur team golf championship for women organised by the European Golf Association.

References

External links 
 European Golf Association: Full results

European Amateur Team Championship
Golf tournaments in the Netherlands
European Amateur Team Championship
European Amateur Team Championship
European Amateur Team Championship